Robert Samuel Morris (born February 8, 1985), is an American songwriter, singer, and guitarist of Chicago-based indie group The Hush Sound. His current project is called Le Swish.

Morris is also the bassist in the band Debate Team with OneRepublic guitarist Drew Brown, OK Go drummer Dan Konopka and vocalist Ryan McNeill. Debate Team's debut EP, entitled Wins Again, was released independently in January 2011 and is available in the United States via iTunes.

References

External links
 Le Swish

Living people
1985 births
American rock guitarists
The Hush Sound members